Mimas (Ancient Greek: Μίμας) was a Greek mythological character who appears in Virgil's Aeneid.  He was the son of Amycus and Theano.  A  noble Trojan, he accompanied Aeneas to Italy, where he was killed by Mezentius.

References 
 
Publius Vergilius Maro, Aeneid. Theodore C. Williams. trans. Boston. Houghton Mifflin Co. 1910. Online version at the Perseus Digital Library.
Publius Vergilius Maro, Bucolics, Aeneid, and Georgics. J. B. Greenough. Boston. Ginn & Co. 1900. Latin text available at the Perseus Digital Library.
Trojans

Characters in the Aeneid